Coleophora haywardi is a moth of the family Coleophoridae. It is known from South America, including Argentina.

Schinopsis is the exclusive food plant of the moth larvae.

References

External links

haywardi
Moths described in 1963
Moths of South America